Rubén Rochina Naixes (born 23 March 1991) is a Spanish professional footballer who plays for Granada CF as a winger or a forward.

Rochina began his professional career with Barcelona B before joining Blackburn Rovers in 2011, spending three years with the club that included two loan spells, at Zaragoza and Rayo Vallecano.

Club career

Barcelona
Born in Sagunto, Valencian Community, Rochina arrived at FC Barcelona's youth system at the age of 13, after starting his development with local Valencia CF.

Whilst still a junior, he appeared in 13 games for Barcelona's reserves in the Segunda División B, playing three times (117 minutes) in the 2009–10 season as Luis Enrique's side returned to Segunda División after an 11-year absence.

Blackburn Rovers
On 31 January 2011, without having appeared for Barcelona's first team, Rochina joined Premier League team Blackburn Rovers on a four-year deal. On 11 February, he scored twice for the reserves against Newcastle United's reserves in a 4–4 draw.

On 16 April 2011, Rochina made his league debut for his new club, starting in a 2–0 loss at Everton. On 24 August he scored his first competitive goal for Rovers, just five minutes into the League Cup match against Sheffield Wednesday, and added a second in the 3–1 home win.

Rochina scored his first league goal for Blackburn on 11 September, in a 1–1 away draw to Fulham. In the next game he provided an assist in a 4–3 home victory over Arsenal, and appeared in 18 matches during the campaign as the team was relegated.

On 1 September 2012, Rochina scored a back-heeled goal to equalise six minutes from time in a 3–3 away draw against Leeds United. He spent the second half of the campaign on loan at Real Zaragoza. He made his La Liga debut on 3 February 2013 as a 74th-minute substitute in a 1–1 away draw with Málaga CF, and scored his first goal in the competition on 27 April to help defeat RCD Mallorca 3–2 at La Romareda, as the Aragonese eventually suffered relegation after finishing bottom.

On the opening day of the 2013–14 Championship season, Rochina dislocated his shoulder during the fixture against Derby County. After surgery, he missed the next three months of the campaign, and on 20 January 2014 he returned to the Spanish top flight on loan, this time to Rayo Vallecano. His first appearance came six days later, in a 2–4 home loss to Atlético Madrid in which he played 34 minutes.

Granada
On 3 August 2014, Rochina signed a four-year deal with Granada CF for an undisclosed fee. He scored two goals in his first year, the second being a 50-meter lob in a 3–0 away win over Real Sociedad.

Rochina netted six times in 2015–16 as Los Nazaríes again avoided relegation, including a late equaliser for a 2–2 draw in the Derby of eastern Andalusia away to Málaga CF on 28 November 2015.

Rubin Kazan
On 20 July 2016, Rochina moved abroad for a second time when Russian Premier League side FC Rubin Kazan triggered his €10 million release clause and offered to treble his wages – Blackburn were due 15% of the receipt. He returned to his homeland on 31 January 2018, joining Levante UD on loan until the end of the season.

Levante
Following his loan, Rochina signed a three-year contract with Levante on 4 July 2018. He scored four league goals in each of his first two seasons.

International career
Rochina was capped for Spain at under-17, under-18 and under-19 levels, for a total of 17 caps and eight goals.

Career statistics

Club

Honours
Spain U17
UEFA European Under-17 Championship: 2008

Spain U19
UEFA European Under-19 Championship runner-up: 2010

References

External links

1991 births
Living people
People from Sagunto
Sportspeople from the Province of Valencia
Spanish footballers
Footballers from the Valencian Community
Association football wingers
Association football forwards
La Liga players
Segunda División players
Segunda División B players
FC Barcelona Atlètic players
Real Zaragoza players
Rayo Vallecano players
Granada CF footballers
Levante UD footballers
Premier League players
English Football League players
Blackburn Rovers F.C. players
Russian Premier League players
FC Rubin Kazan players
Spain youth international footballers
Spanish expatriate footballers
Expatriate footballers in England
Expatriate footballers in Russia
Spanish expatriate sportspeople in England
Spanish expatriate sportspeople in Russia